The 2022–23 season is the 100th season in the history of Vitória S.C. and their 16th consecutive season in the top flight. The club are participating in the Primeira Liga, the Taça de Portugal, the Taça da Liga and the UEFA Europa Conference League.

Players

Out on loan

Transfers

Pre-season and friendlies

Competitions

Overall record

Primeira Liga

League table

Results summary

Results by round

Matches 
The league fixtures were announced on 5 July 2022.

Taça de Portugal

Taça da Liga

UEFA Europa Conference League

Second qualifying round 
The draw for the second qualifying round was held on 15 June 2022.

Third qualifying round 
The draw for the third qualifying round was held on 18 July 2022.

References 

Vitória S.C. seasons
Vitoria
Vitoria